Jean-Louis Rapnouil (born 24 January 1966 in Fort-de-France, Martinique) is a French athlete who specialises in the 400 meters. Rapnouil competed at the 1992 Summer Olympics and 1996 Summer Olympics.

References 
 sports reference

1966 births
Living people
Sportspeople from Fort-de-France
Martiniquais athletes
French male sprinters
Olympic athletes of France
French people of Martiniquais descent
Athletes (track and field) at the 1992 Summer Olympics
Athletes (track and field) at the 1996 Summer Olympics
World Athletics Championships athletes for France
Mediterranean Games gold medalists for France
Mediterranean Games medalists in athletics
Athletes (track and field) at the 1993 Mediterranean Games
Athletes (track and field) at the 1997 Mediterranean Games